Sturt Copse is a  biological Site of Special Scientific Interest north-west of Oxford in Oxfordshire.

This wood has many giant stools of coppiced of ash and wych elm trees, together with oaks, some of them pollarded. Most of the ground layer is dominated by dog's mercury, and there are uncommon plants such as yellow star-of-Bethlehem, Lathraea squamaria and hard shield-fern.

References

 
Sites of Special Scientific Interest in Oxfordshire